Chéroy is a commune in the Yonne department in Bourgogne-Franche-Comté in north-central France.

Geography
The river Lunain forms part of the commune's northern border.

See also
Communes of the Yonne department

References

Communes of Yonne